Otgontsetseg Galbadrakh (born 25 January 1992) is a Mongolian-born Kazakhstani judoka. She represented her country at the 2016 Summer Olympics, where she won the bronze medal in the −48 kg event.

Personal life
Born in Ulaanbaatar, Mongolia, Otgontsetseg became a naturalized Kazakhstani citizen in 2015.

References

External links
 
 
 

1992 births
Living people
Sportspeople from Ulaanbaatar
Mongolian female judoka
Kazakhstani female judoka
Naturalised citizens of Kazakhstan
Mongolian emigrants to Kazakhstan
Kazakhstani people of Mongolian descent
Judoka at the 2016 Summer Olympics
Judoka at the 2020 Summer Olympics
Olympic judoka of Kazakhstan
Medalists at the 2016 Summer Olympics
Olympic bronze medalists for Kazakhstan
Olympic medalists in judo
Universiade medalists in judo
Judoka at the 2018 Asian Games
Asian Games bronze medalists for Kazakhstan
Asian Games medalists in judo
Medalists at the 2018 Asian Games
Universiade bronze medalists for Kazakhstan
Medalists at the 2017 Summer Universiade